Onega bracteata is a species of leafhoppers in the family Cicadellidae. It is native to parts of South America.

Description 
Onega bracteata is a rather large and compact sharpshooter with a length from 13.8-15 mm. Females are usually slightly larger than males. The pronotum is wider than the head. The veination is distinct but veins are not elevated.

Distribution 
Onega bracteata has been described from Ecuador, Peru, Colombia and Bolivia where it was found in Andean locations 2000 m or more above sea level.

References 

Cicadellini